George Stanley Charles Holliday (14 February 1917 – 14 May 1990) was a British bobsledder who competed in the late 1940s.  He finished seventh in the four-man event at the 1948 Winter Olympics in St. Moritz.

References

British Olympic Association profile
1948 bobsleigh four-man results

1917 births
1990 deaths
Olympic bobsledders of Great Britain
Bobsledders at the 1948 Winter Olympics
British male bobsledders